Cojoba is a genus of flowering plants in the family Fabaceae.

Selected species
 Cojoba arborea
 Cojoba rufescens

References

External links

Mimosoids
Fabaceae genera
Taxonomy articles created by Polbot